Fulad-zereh (Fulâd-zereh) meaning "[possessing] steel armor," is the name of a huge horned demon in the Persian story of Amir Arsalan. He made aerial wanderings and spotted and kidnapped beautiful women, and took them to his lair.

Early in his career he was the chief general of the fairy king, Malek Khazen, who ruled over the land of Zahrgiah. 

Fulad-zereh's mother, a powerful witch in her own right, used a charm to make Fulad-zereh's body invulnerable to all weapons except the blows of the sword Shamshir-e Zomorrodnegar. At the end of the story, however, both Fulad-zereh and his mother were slain by Zoroastrian God of Spirit, Milad.

Bibliography
Mohammad-Ali Naqib-al-Mamalek, Amir Arsalan-e Rumi, ed. M. J. Mahjub, Tehran, 1340 sh./1961
German translation: R. Gelpke as Amir Arsalan: Liebe und Abenteuer des Amir Arsalan, Zurich, 1965

References
Encyclopaedia Iranica (article by M. Omidsalar)

Daevas
Persian mythology
Persian legendary creatures
Iranian folklore
Persian words and phrases